Kūkaniloko was an ancient Hawaiian noble lady, who became the Chiefess (Hawaiian: Aliʻi Wahine) of the island of Oahu, and had a long reign.

Biography 
Chiefess Kūkaniloko was born on Oʻahu as a daughter of High Chief Piliwale and his spouse, High Chiefess his sister Kawa'ala'auaka, his sister. Kūkanilokoʻs younger sister was called Kohipalaoa; they were Piliwaleʻs only children, and he had no sons. After Piliwale's death, Kūkaniloko became the first female ruler of the whole island of Oʻahu; there were some female rulers on Oʻahu before Kūkaniloko — like Mualani — but they ruled only over the small portion of Oʻahu.

Marriage 
Kūkaniloko married a man called Luaia, who was a chief from Maui. They had at least one child — Kalaʻimanuʻia, who became the Chiefess of Oʻahu (after her mother's death).

See also 

Alii nui of Oahu

References 

Royalty of Oahu
Year of death unknown
Hawaiian queens regnant